Clifton is a suburb of Swinton in the City of Salford in Greater Manchester, England. It lies along the edge of Irwell Valley in the north of the City of Salford. Historically in Lancashire, it was a centre for coal mining, and once formed part of the Municipal Borough of Swinton and Pendlebury.

History
Clifton is derived from the Old English clif and tun, and means the "settlement near a cliff, slope or riverbank".
Clifton was mentioned in the Pipe Roll of 1183–84.

Coal mining
Clifton Hall Colliery was west of Lumns Lane, on the site now occupied by a domestic refuse and recycling site run by the Greater Manchester Waste Disposal Authority. The colliery was operating by 1820, and its tramway is shown on a parliamentary plan from 1830 and an 1845 map. It closed in 1929.

On 18 June 1885, an underground explosion at the colliery killed 178 men and boys. The inquest and the official report concluded that explosion was caused by firedamp igniting on contact with a candle.  Blacksmith George Hindley (aged 16) and fireman George Higson, were part of a band of men who descended into the mine immediately after the explosion. They received an Albert Medal (2nd class) in recognition of their heroism.

Wet Earth Colliery in Clifton closed in 1928; its remains can still be seen in Clifton Country Park, close to the River Irwell and the Manchester-Preston railway line near the bottom of Clifton House Road, which runs uphill from the Irwell Valley to its junction with the A666 Manchester Road, opposite Clifton Cricket Ground.

Industry
The Pilkington's Lancastrian Pottery was established in 1892. The Chloride Electrical Storage Company opened its battery factory at Clifton Junction in 1893. Magnesium Elektron Ltd built a large factory at Clifton Junction to produce magnesium metal in 1936.

Governance
Clifton was a township in the ecclesiastical parish of Eccles in the hundred of Salford in Lancashire. The township was dissolved in 1933 and its areas divided between Kearsley Urban District and the Municipal Borough of Swinton and Pendlebury.

Geography
Clifton lies five miles north west of Manchester on the A666 road (Manchester Road) to Bolton. The township covered 850 acres in the valley of the River Irwell, which forms the north east boundary. The Manchester-Preston railway line passes through and there was a junction with the line to Bury and Rossendale which opened to Rawtenstall in September 1846.
The highest land rises to over 300 feet above sea level in the west of the township near the Worsley boundary and is moss land. The underlying rocks are New Red Sandstone between Clifton and Ringley while the rest of the township lies on the Middle Coal Measures of the Manchester Coalfield. 
Much of Clifton's boundary with Pendlebury is defined by Slack Brook which flows eventually into the Irwell not far from where Agecroft Power Station once stood. Slack Brook has been largely culverted for many years under landfill tipping since the 1950s.

Transport
Clifton is served by Clifton railway station on the Ribble Valley Line. In earlier times, the station was known as "Clifton Junction" from its location at the junction of the Manchester and Bolton Railway and Manchester, Bury and Rossendale Railway lines. The Bury line left the station/junction and passed over Clifton Viaduct, known locally as "the thirteen arches", across the Irwell Valley. Clifton Junction was important in bringing workers to the three large factories in the area, Magnesium Elektron Ltd (M.E.L.), Chloride Batteries and Pilkington's Tiles. The Manchester, Bolton and Bury Canal passed through Clifton. The Clifton Aqueduct carried the canal across the River Irwell. and is preserved as a Grade II listed building. There are plans to restore the canal for leisure use at a cost of over £50M.

Churches
The area is served by two Anglican churches. 
St. Anne's has stood on Manchester Road since its completion in 1874. 
St. Thomas's on Delamere Avenue, off Rake Lane, was built in 1974 to replace an earlier building on Rake Lane opposite the junction with Whitehead Road. The earlier church was built in 1898 as a mission church to serve a small community of outlying farms and cottages. Composed of corrugated metal sheeting, it became known affectionately as “Th'owd Tin Mission” rather than St. Thomas's.

Education
Clifton has two primary schools and a pupil referral unit within its boundaries:

Clifton Library
Clifton Library is located on Wynne Avenue (formerly part of Rake Lane) in the Clifton Community Centre.

Sport
Clifton Cricket Club play in the Premier Division of the recently established Greater Manchester Cricket League. The Club have gone through a recent period of success with winning the GMCLT20 competition 3 times and becoming regional T20 champions. They also reached the finals of both the National ECB Club Vitality Blast and the Lancashire Knock Out. The club's ground is on Manchester Road not far from junction 16 of the M60 motorway.

Queensmere Dam off Queensway is leased from the Forestry Commission by Swinton and Pendlebury Anglers. Queensway was only built (across what was farmland) in the early 1960s to directly link much of Rake Lane and Lumns Lane (at the former Bee Hive public house - now Holyrood private nursery) with Bolton Road (A666), Pendlebury at its junction with Station Road (B5231) instead of having to use nearby Billy Lane. Before this, Queensmere Dam was known locally as simply "the Dam".

Public houses
There are currently three public houses within Clifton. These are the Oddfellows Arms, the Golden Lion and the Robin Hood, all along the same side of Manchester Road. On Rake Lane, at the junction with Queensway, stands the Holyrood nursery which was, until recent times, the Beehive public house.

Clifton Barracks
The British Army's Territorial Army Centre on Manchester Road, very close to junction 16 of the M60 motorway, is known locally by its informal title of "Clifton Barracks".

See also
Fletcher's Canal

References

Geography of Salford
Areas of Greater Manchester